

Events
 April 23 – The 23rd Street YMCA of New York City wins the first national basketball championship tournament, organized by the U.S. Amateur Athletic Union (AAU).

References